Paul Gleeson may refer to:

 Paul Gleeson (magician) (born 1987), Irish TV magician, mentalist and escapologist
 Paul Gleeson (tennis) (1880–1956), American tennis player

See also
 Paul Gleason (1939–2006), American actor